The Sweetest Illusion is the third solo studio album by Polish-born singer-songwriter Basia, released in May 1994 by Epic Records. The record spawned the hit "Drunk on Love".

Overview
The album took two and a half years to make. It was primarily recorded at Whitfield Street Recording Studios in London, apart from piano parts, which were recorded at London's Westside Studios. The material was mastered at Sony Music Studios in New York. Contrarily to Basia's previous albums, The Sweetest Illusion moves away from electronically generated music towards traditional live instruments. Basia dedicated this album "to her family and compatriots in Poland as well as those scattered around the world". Two songs on the album incorporate Polish language: in "An Olive Tree" Basia sings: "Oliwkowe drzewo może spełnić twe marzenia" (English: "An olive tree can make your dreams come true") and towards the end of "Yearning", she sings the opening line from a Polish folk song: "Szła dzieweczka do laseczka, do zielonego". The latter was described by Basia as the song she is most proud of and the best she has ever written. Its lyrics are about "missing home" and to emphasize this feeling, the track includes whale vocalization, which was Danny's idea.

"More Fire Than Flame" was released as Japan-only single in 1993. In mid-April 1994, the ballad "Yearning" was serviced to contemporary jazz stations as the first US single, although in other territories it was released as the album's final single in late 1994. The track was accompanied by a music video directed by Howard Greenhalgh, in which Basia and her two nieces appeared in Polish folk costumes. The song failed to chart, but entered the Tokio Hot 100 list on Japanese radio station J-Wave. "Drunk on Love" was released as the next single in June 1994 and topped Billboards Dance Club Songs. It was followed by "Third Time Lucky" later in 1994.

The album was met with particular commercial success in Japan where it became Basia's biggest-selling album and her only platinum record there. In the USA though, The Sweetest Illusion did not repeat the success of the two previous albums, nonetheless, it was certified gold by the Recording Industry Association of America in December 1994 for sales in excess of 500,000 units. It was her final major-label full-length studio album. In 2016, the album was re-released by independent UK label Cherry Red Records as 3 CD deluxe edition featuring instrumental versions and remixes.

Track listing
All songs written by Basia Trzetrzelewska and Danny White, except where noted.

"Drunk on Love" (Trzetrzelewska, White, Peter Ross) – 4:46
"Third Time Lucky" – 5:01
"Yearning" – 5:22
"She Deserves It/Rachel's Wedding" (featuring Trey Lorenz) – 4:52
"An Olive Tree" (Kevin Robinson, Trzetrzelewska, White) – 5:01
"The Sweetest Illusion" (Trzetrzelewska, White, Ross) – 4:58
"Perfect Mother" – 3:50
"More Fire Than Flame" (Trzetrzelewska, White, Ross) – 4:13
"Simple Pleasures" – 4:53
"My Cruel Ways" – 4:54
"The Prayer of a Happy Housewife" – 4:56

Personnel 
 Basia Trzetrzelewska – lead vocals, backing vocals (3, 11), crowd vocals (5)
 Danny White – keyboards, whistling (2), crowd vocals (5)
 Peter White – guitars (1, 2, 4-11), acoustic guitar (3), accordion (4, 7)
 Andy Ross – electric guitar (3), mandolin (4, 10), bandurria (4), guitars (6, 10, 11)
 Julian Crampton – bass (1, 3, 6, 9, 11), double bass (4)
 Andres Lafone – bass (2, 5, 7)
 Randy Hope-Taylor – bass (8, 10)
 Andy Gangadeen – drums, triangle (6), shaker (7)
 Karl Vanden Bossche – percussion (1, 2, 3, 5, 7-11), wind chimes (4)
 Bosco De Oliveira – percussion (2, 7), shaker (4)
 Patrick Clahar – saxophone (2, 6), alto saxophone (5), tenor saxophone (5)
 Chris DeMargary – baritone saxophone (5), flute (11), alto flute (11)
 Steve Gregory – saxophone (10)
 Fayyaz Virji – trombone (2, 5, 8, 9, 10)
 Kevin Robinson – trumpet (1, 2, 5, 6, 8), flugelhorn (2, 5, 9, 10, 11), crowd vocals (5), French horn (9)
 Nick Ingman – string arrangements (3, 10)
 Gavyn Wright – strings leader (3, 6, 10), violin (4)
 Mark Anthoni – backing vocals (3, 11), crowd vocals (5)
 Trey Lorenz – lead and backing vocals (4)

Production 
 Produced and arranged by Basia Trzetrzelewska and Danny White
 Recorded by Mark Chamberlain
 Assistant recording – Jason Scott Westbrook
 Pianos recorded by Paul Mortimer, assisted by Lee Phillips
 Mixed by David Bascombe
 Mastered by Vlado Meller
 Design and artwork – Bill Smith Studio, London
 Paintings – Halina Tymusz
 Photography – Paul Cox
 Management – Dee Anthony
 Make-up – Helen Whiting

Charts

Weekly charts

Year-end charts

Certifications

Release history

References

External links
 The official Basia website
 The Sweetest Illusion on Discogs

1994 albums
Basia albums
Epic Records albums